José María Valverde Pacheco (26 January 1926, Valencia de Alcántara (Cáceres) – 6 June 1996, Barcelona) was a Spanish poet, essayist, literary critic, philosophy historian, and Spanish translator.

Biography
Valverde was born in Extremadura, but spent his childhood and teenage years in Madrid. While still a student at the Instituto Ramiro de Maeztu he published his first book, Man of God: Psalms, elegies and prayers, which was funded by the Institute. Although Damaso Alonso tempted him to study philology, Valverde pursued Philosophy; his doctorate included a thesis on Wilhelm von Humboldt's philosophy of language. That same year he married Pilar Gefaell, with whom he had five children, including Mariana Valverde, a Professor of Criminology at the University of Toronto.

He wrote in various magazines: La Estafeta Literaria, Escorial, Works and Days, Root, and the Ensign and Journal of Aesthetic Ideas, at times using the pseudonym "Gambrinus". His essays were later collected in The Art of the Article (1949–1993) (Barcelona, 1994). He also published in poetic magazines including Garcilaso, Espadaña, Proel. Between 1950 and 1955, Valverde lived in Rome, where he was reader of Spanish at Sapienza University of Rome and at the Spanish Institute, and met Benedetto Croce. At age 29 in 1956, he obtained the chair of Aesthetics at the University of Barcelona. This setting and his experiences as a professor inspired "The conquest of the world" (1960). He participated in the literary magazines of the time and in numerous periodicals, which published much of his thinking. He himself said he was a poet rather than a philosopher, and not vice versa. He was devoted to the study of history of ideas. Collaborating with Martí de Riquer i Morera in an ambitious History of literature (1957, greatly expanded later) and writing a Life and death of ideas: small stories thoughts (1981), he launched his award-winning translations of classics of literature in English and German. With a clear social and political commitment, Christian and anti-Francoist, he supported the popular cause in Central America (Cuba, the Sandinistas: relating to exiled Nicaraguan poets Julio Ycaza, Luis Rocha and Fernando Silva.) For political reasons (solidarity with teachers Enrique Tierno Galván, José Luis Aranguren and Agustin Garcia Calvo who were expelled from the University of Madrid by Franco), he resigned his professorship in 1964 and went into exile. He is credited with the now famous phrase, written on the blackboard in farewell: "Nulla aesthetica sine ethica. Ergo apaga y vámonos." He went to the United States, where he was professor of Hispanic and comparative literature (University of Virginia, McMaster) and then to Canada where he was a professor of Spanish literature at Trent University. This experience is part of his poem "The Tower of Babel falls on the poet":

"Mature in age and poetry
you moved to a foreign speaking country,
and it is not living. What they say here,
ia easy as breathing, easy, rich, accurate,
you're trying to mimic them with effort,
and hear your voice, ridiculous and strange,
fail as a child always right here,
end up saying something not yours.
Now I am alien to the landscape:
do not talk to you: to the bird and the tree
and the river spared you the legends
wrap their names here-in you tags.
In vain you smile to others
polite, and even friends, cheering
from the language in which they are the masters:
fails to love them: you forget:
the depths of your spirit does not beat
does not live in the language that is your history."
(Ser de palabra, 1973).

Before returning to Spain, he published in 1971 Teachings of Age (Poetry 1945–1970), a volume collecting the first six books of poems. He returned to Spain and his professorship in 1975 (according to some), in 1977 according to others. The editorial Trotta in Madrid has undertaken the publication of his Complete Works, which led to his writing four volumes: the first of Poetry (1998), the second and third of aesthetics and literary theory, and the fourth in the history of ideas. He died in Barcelona in 1996, at seventy years of a terminal illness, while devoting his energies to investigate the latest work of Kierkegaard.

Work
In his critical work is worth mentioning Studies on the poetic word (1952), Humboldt and the philosophy of language (1955), History of literature (1957), Letters to a skeptical priest in modern art (1959), Life and death of ideas: small stories thoughts (1981), Aesthetic Dictionary or monographs on Azorín (1971), Antonio Machado (1975), James Joyce (1978 and 1982), or Nietzsche.

Of importance are his German translations (Hölderlin, Rilke, Goethe, Novalis, Brecht, Christian Morgenstern, Hans Urs von Balthasar) and English (theater: complete Shakespeare prose,  likewise those of Charles Dickens, T. S. Eliot, Walt Whitman, Herman Melville, Saul Bellow, Thomas Merton, Edgar Allan Poe, Emily Dickinson, or Joyce's Ulysses (novel), for which he received the Translation Prize Fray Luis de León, 1977). In 1960 he received the same award for a collection of Rainer Maria Rilke. In 1990 he was also awarded National Award for the work of a translator. Also translated some poems of Constantine Cavafy from Modern Greek, the New Testament from Ancient Greek, and Romano Guardini from Italian.

He prepared, in addition, critical editions of Antonio Machado, one of his favorite authors (New Songs, In an apocryphal songbook and Juan de Mairena) and Azorín (Forgotten Items and Peoples), anthologies of general Spanish and Latin American poetry and specially Luis Felipe Vivanco, Miguel de Unamuno and Ernesto Cardenal. The problems of contemporary art in his book resonated in Letters to a skeptical priest in modern art (1959).

He was especially concerned with a particular stream of existentialism: Christian man in what he called, with Damaso Alonso in the prologue to a book of his, uprooted poetry. His early poems have a religious theme. Then he introduced new issues in his poetry, more human, closer to Marxist approaches. It has been said that he was a Christian Marxist, with an approach close to the thesis Liberation Theology. His work is characterized by a marked humanism with intimate touches, making him one of the brightest figures of Spanish poetry scene.

A poet of organic books, where the whole is greater than the sum of the constituent poems, his style is characterized by simplicity and expressive language (almost conversational), always looking for openness, purity and precision, without unnecessary rhetoric, in the tradition of Antonio Machado. That desire led him to remove numerous poems from his latest compilation, making it  successively smaller. Some of this can be seen in his famous poem about the hanged François Villon. He preferred to express himself in Arte Mayor and the alexandrine.

He received inter alia, the National Poetry Award in 1949, the Critics Award in 1962 and the Ciutat de Barcelona Prize for his Collected poems 1945–1990. In poetry, his books include Hombre de Dios in 1945, La espera in 1949,
Versos del domingo in 1954, Voces y acompañamientos para San Mateo in 1959, La conquista de este mundo in 1960, Años inciertos in 1970, and Ser de palabra in 1976.

His personal archive is located in the Pavelló de la República CRAI Library – University of Barcelona . It consists of published and not published writings, handwritten translations and notes; writer's personal papers, letters sent and/or received by José María Valverde, press clippings, tributes and condolence letters written to the Valverde family.

Complete Works
Editorial Trotta has published Complete Works:
Poesía  / 
Interlocutores  / 
Escenarios. Estética y teoría literaria 
Historia de las mentalidades

Bibliography

Poetry
Hombre de Dios. Salmos, elegías y oraciones, 1945.
La espera, 1949.
Versos del domingo, 1954.
Voces y acompañamientos para San Mateo, 1959.
La conquista de este mundo, 1960.
Años inciertos, 1970.
Ser de palabra, 1976.
Enseñanzas de la edad. Poesía 1945–1970 (1971)
Poesías reunidas 1945–1990

Criticism
Estudio sobre la palabra poética (1952)
Vida y muerte de las ideas (1981)
Breve historia y antología de la estética, Barcelona: Ariel, 1987.
Historia de la literatura universal (tres volúmenes, en 1956; ampliada a diez en 1986), en colaboración con Martín de Riquer
Nietzsche, de filólogo  Anticristo (1993)
Diccionario de Historia, Barcelona: Planeta, 1995.
Cartas a un cura escéptico en materia de arte moderno, Barcelona: Seix Barral, 1959.
Azorín, Barcelona: Planeta, 1971.
Antonio Machado, Madrid: Siglo XXI, 1975.
Conocer Joyce y su obra, 1978.
Breve historia de la literatura española, Madrid: Guadarrama, 1980.
Joyce, Barcelona, 1982.
Movimientos literarios, 1981.
La mente del siglo XX, 1982.
La literatura: Qué era y qué es. Barcelona: Montesinos, 1982.
El arte del artículo (1949–1993). Barcelona, 1994.
Valverde, José María, Antonio Colinas, Rafael Argullol, Antoni Marí and Jaime Siles. Diálogos sobre poesía española. Frankfurt and Madrid: Vervuert Verlag Iberoamericana, 1994.

Translations and editing
Thomas Merton. Poems. Barcelona: Rialp, 1953.
Rainer Maria Rilke. Fifty poems. Madrid: Agora, 1954.
Hans Urs von Balthasar. Theology of history. Madrid: Guadarrama, 1959.
Charles Dickens. The Pickwick Papers. Barcelona: Planeta, 1963.
Doris Lessing. Singing Grass. Barcelona: Seix Barral, 1964.
Rainer Maria Rilke. Works. Barcelona: Plaza & Janes, 1967.
John Updike. Pigeon Feathers and Other Stories. Barcelona: Seix Barral, 1967.
William Shakespeare. Full Theatre. Barcelona: Planeta, 1967–1968. 2 vol. (Multiple editions of single works.)
Saul Bellow. Carpe diem: Take the flower of the day. Barcelona: Seix Barral, 1968.
Raymond Cartier. The Second World War. Paris / Barcelona: Larousse / Planeta, 1968. 2. Nd ed.
Herman Melville. Works. Barcelona: Planeta, 1968.
Antonio Machado. New songs. In an apocryphal songbook. Madrid: Castalia, 1971.
Antonio Machado. Juan de Mairena: sentences, jokes, sketches and apocryphal memories of a teacher. Madrid: Castalia, 1972.
Azorín. Articles forgotten José Martínez Ruiz: 1894–1904. Barcelona: Narcea, 1972.
Alexandr Alexandrovich Fadéiev and Mikhail Alexandrovich Sholokhov. Soviet Narrative. Barcelona: Planeta, 1973. (In collaboration with Augusto Vidal.)
Christian Morgenstern. Songs from the gallows. Madrid: Visor, 1976.
James Joyce. Ulysses. Barcelona: Lumen, 1976.
Azorín. Peoples, and other tragic Andalucía (1904–1905). Madrid: Castalia, 1978.
Henry James. The Aspern Papers and Other Stories. Barcelona: Planeta, 1978.
Jane Austen. Emma. Barcelona: Lumen, 1978.
Thomas Stearns Eliot. Collected poems, 1909–1962. Madrid: Alianza, 1978.
James Joyce. Stephen Hero. Barcelona: Lumen, 1978.
Herman Melville. Moby Dick. Barcelona: Bruguera, 1979.
Gabriel Ferrater. Women and days. Barcelona: Seix Barral, 1979. (In collaboration with Pere Gimferrer and José Agustín Goytisolo)
Arthur Conan Doyle. Adventures of Sherlock Holmes. Barcelona: Bruguera, 1980. (In collaboration with Maria Campuzano.)
Johann Wolfgang Goethe. Splendor. Barcelona: Planeta, 1980.
Rainer Maria Rilke. Duino Elegies. Barcelona: Lumen, 1980.
William Faulkner. The course, the people, the wilderness. Barcelona: Seix Barral, 1980.
William Faulkner. In this earth and beyond. Barcelona: Seix Barral, 1981.
Johann Wolfgang Goethe. The sufferings of Young Werther. Barcelona: Planeta, 1981.
Pedro Calderon de la Barca. Life is a Dream: drama and morality play. Barcelona: Planeta, 1981.
Alain Fournier. Le Grand Meaulnes. Barcelona: Bruguera, 1983. (In collaboration with Maria Campuzano.)
Friedrich Hölderlin. Poems. Barcelona: Icaria, 1983.
Rainer Maria Rilke. Letters to a Young Poet. Madrid: Alianza, 1984.
Johann Wolfgang Goethe. Elective Affinities. Barcelona: Icaria, 1984.
Novalis. Hymns to the night. Barcelona: Icaria, 1985.
Hans Urs von Balthasar. The Christian and anxiety. Barcelona: Caparros, 1988.
Azorín. Anarchist Articles. Barcelona: Lumen, 1992.
William Faulkner. These thirteen. Pamplona: Hierbaola, 1994.
Romano Guardini. Works. Madrid: Christianity, s.f.

External links
 José María Valverde and his work
 Inventari del Fons FP, Subsèrie José M. Valverde, del CRAI Biblioteca del Pavelló de la República de la Universitat de Barcelona

1926 births
1996 deaths
English–Spanish translators
German–Spanish translators
James Joyce scholars
Philosophers of art
Spanish historians of philosophy
Spanish literary historians
Spanish literary critics
Translators of James Joyce
Translators of William Shakespeare
Complutense University of Madrid alumni
20th-century Spanish writers
20th-century Spanish poets
20th-century translators
Exiles of the Spanish Civil War in the United States